The Mombasa–Nairobi Standard Gauge Railway is a standard-gauge railway (SGR) in Kenya that connects the large Indian Ocean city of Mombasa with Nairobi, the country's capital and largest city. This SGR runs parallel to the narrow-gauge Uganda Railway that was completed in 1901 under British colonial rule. The East African Railway Master Plan provides for the Mombasa–Nairobi SGR to link with other SGRs being built in the East African Community.

The prime contractor was the China Road & Bridge Corporation CRBC, which hired 25,000 Kenyans to work on the railway. CRBC's holding company, China Communications Construction Company is contracted to operate the line for its first five years. As of 2020, railway operation expenses exceeded revenues.

The first fare-paying passengers boarded the "Madaraka Express" on Madaraka Day (1 June 2017), the 54th anniversary of Kenya's attainment of self-rule from Great Britain. Commercial freight services began on 1 January 2018. Passenger uptake has exceeded expectations, with the train carrying 2 million riders in the first 17 months of operation. By November 2018, the SGR was operating 30 freight trains and 4 passenger trains per day. double stack freight trains have run on the line since 2018.

Route

The Mombasa-Nairobi SGR generally runs parallel to the Uganda Railway, a metre-gauge that was built during British colonial rule. The SGR, however, has a straighter alignment that accommodates higher speeds. Because of the rough and hilly terrain, large portions of the SGR were built on viaducts and embankments and in cuttings.

For example, the Uganda Railway tackled the hilly terrain near Mazeras township by using a spiral. As it approaches Nairobi, the SGR crosses the  Athi River Super Bridge, which at the time of its completion was the sixth-longest bridge in Africa. The SGR has a total of 98 bridges.

Another purpose of the SGR's viaducts and embankments is environmental protection. The SGR passes through the transportation corridor between Tsavo East National Park and Tsavo West National Park, which is also host to the Nairobi–Mombasa Road and the Uganda Railway. Because the road and metre-gauge railway were built at ground level, collisions with wildlife can occur. Viaducts and embankments elevate the SGR above ground level, with underpasses allowing wildlife to pass safely underneath.

Passenger trains run between Mombasa Terminus in Miritini and Nairobi Terminus in Syokimau, near the Jomo Kenyatta International Airport.

Freight services are provided between Port Reitz, just west of Mombasa Island, and the inland container depot in the Embakasi division of Nairobi.

Passenger stations

There are nine passenger stations between Mombasa and Nairobi. Each station's architecture is inspired by local elements.

Passengers can transfer at Nairobi Terminus to metre-gauge trains into the Nairobi city centre. Although they are designated as terminals, the Mombasa and Nairobi stations were built as through stations and were originally designated Mombasa West Station and Nairobi South Station. When Phase 2 of the SGR is completed, trains will continue through the Nairobi station to the Uganda border.

Specifications
Kenya is a member of the Northern Corridor Integration Project (NCIP), which has selected the Chinese National Railway Class 1 standard for its railways. The adoption of a common standard allows for seamless integration between the railways of NCIP countries.

 Gauge: Standard-gauge
 Couplers: Janney AAR
 Brakes: Air
 Electrification: None, in planning
 Design capacity: 22 million tonnes per year
 Structure gauge: Sufficient for double-stack containers

History

In the 2000s, Kenya's colonial-era metre-gauge railways deteriorated from lack of maintenance. By 2016, passenger trains were taking an entire day to travel from Nairobi to Mombasa, compared to 12 hours during the early 1990s. Freight transported from the Port of Mombasa fell from 4.8 million tonnes per year in the 1980s to 1.5 million tonnes per year in 2012. In 2014, the Rift Valley Railways Consortium, the operator of railways in Kenya and Uganda, reported a loss of US$1.5 million.

At the same time, the Chinese government was funding railway construction in other African countries. In 2011, Kenya signed a memorandum of understanding with the China Road & Bridge Corporation to build a standard-gauge railway between Mombasa and Nairobi. The US$3.6 billion railway was the largest infrastructure project in Kenya since independence. Financing was finalised in May 2014, with the Exim Bank of China extending a loan for 90 percent of the project cost and the remaining 10 percent coming from the Kenyan government. 25,000 Kenyans were hired to work on the project.

Tracklaying was completed in December 2016. Passenger service was officially inaugurated on 31 May 2017, eighteen months ahead of schedule.

Financing
The project cost of the first phase of the SGR from Mombasa to Nairobi was 90% financed by the Export-Import Bank of China. The remainder of the project cost was funded by the Kenyan government. The $3.23 billion financing from Exim was finalised in May 2014. Exim advanced the loan amount in two subsidized loans of US$1.63 billion each. One of the loans was a foreign aid loan provided on a concessional basis (very low interest rate) while the other was a below-market rate preferential export buyer's credit. A condition imposed by the Kenyan government for the financing was 40% of the total project costs or about 130 billion Kenyan shillings would be spent on local supplies including sand, cement, electric cables, galvanised iron and steel.

A condition by Exim Bank for the loan was to have an operator acceptable to the bank for the initial phase of operations, which led the Kenyan government to reject a planned international tender and to contract the mother company of CRBC.

In January 2020, Business Daily Africa reported that the second loan, related to the Nairobi-Naivasha section of the Kenyan SGR, amounting to $1.482 billion, with a five-year grace period, fell due in January 2021. It attracts an interest rate of approximately 3.34 percent per annum and will be due in 30 semi-annual installments, beginning on 21 January 2021 until 21 July 2035.

Land allocation controversy
On July 22, 2020, Mohammed Abdalla Swazuri, the chairman of National Land Commission, and Atanas Kariuki Maina, managing director of the Kenya Railways Corporation, were among 18 officials, businesspeople and companies arrested on corruption charges involving land allocation for the $3 billion flagship Nairobi-Mombasa railway.

Operation
The railway is owned by the Kenya Railways Corporation (KRC), a state-owned corporation of Kenya. It contracts the operations and maintenance of the line to the Africa Star Railway Operations Company (Afristar), a subsidiary of the China Road and Bridge Corporation (CRBC), and the primary constructor of the line. The CRBC is, in turn, a subsidiary of China Communications Construction Company (CCCC). Afristar was given the legal right to the first ten years of operation of the SGR, with an interim review set for the end of the fifth year of the contract. While many of the employees working on the SGR are Kenyans, as of July 2018 Chinese workers still occupied most of the critical positions, including dispatchers and locomotive drivers. This sparked political controversy in Kenya, as after one year of operations a full handover to Kenyans was yet to take place. The Kenya Transport Ministry explained that a full handover would occur in 2027, according to the current agreement; however, the interim review was initiated to study the feasibility of transferring critical positions to the Kenya Railways Corporation, and successfully negotiated takeover shifting towards an earlier date of May, 2022 with the CRBC. Kenyans will gradually take over all positions on the SGR, completing the full takeover in 2022. During the transition period in June, 2021, the Kenya Railroad Company had already taken over the ticketing, security, and refuelling departments.

In 2018, the railway handled 1.6 million passengers and 5 million tonnes of freight. In 2019, the government required all cargo being cleared in the port in Mombasa to be handled by the railway, leading to protests from cargo transporters. According to a contract between the Exim bank, Kenya Railways Corporation, and Kenya Ports Authority, the KPA must provide 1 million tonnes of freight at the start of the operation, rising to 6 million by 2024.

See also

 Nairobi–Malaba Standard Gauge Railway
 Kenya Standard Gauge Railway
 Uganda Standard Gauge Railway
 Rwanda Standard Gauge Railway

References

Railway lines in Kenya
Standard gauge railways in Kenya
Railway lines opened in 2017
2017 establishments in Kenya
Chinese aid to Africa